The 2014 ADAC Formel Masters was the seventh and the final season of the ADAC Formel Masters series, an open-wheel motor racing series for emerging young racing drivers based in Germany. The season began on 26 April at Motorsport Arena Oschersleben and finished on 5 October at Hockenheim after eight race weekends, totalling 24 races.

Neuhauser Racing Team driver Mikkel Jensen dominated the battle for the drivers' championship from start to finish taking ten wins from the 24 races on his way to the championship title with a round to spare. The other race wins were shared between his teammate Tim Zimmermann, ADAC Berlin-Brandenburg drivers Maximilian Günther and Marvin Dienst, Schiller Motorsport driver Fabian Schiller, as well as Lotus drivers Dennis Marschall and Joel Eriksson.

Teams and drivers

Race calendar and results

Championship standings

Drivers' Championship
Points were awarded as follows:

Teams' championship

References

External links
 
 ADAC Masters Weekend 

ADAC Formel Masters
ADAC Formel Masters seasons
ADAC Formel Masters